Hanna Abu-Hanna (16 October 1928 – 2 February 2022) was a Palestinian writer, poet, and researcher. He was born in Reineh, Mandatory Palestine on 16 October 1928. He belongs to the first generation of Arab resistance poets in Israel. Hanna worked as Director of the Arab Orthodox College in Haifa until 1987. He was also a lecturer at the University of Haifa and at the Teacher Education College in 1973. Abu-Hanna earned a Master's degree in literature. He edited and prepared student programs in Jerusalem and Near East radio stations. He participated in the publication of the Al-Jadeed magazine in 1951, the Al-Ghad magazine in 1953, Al-Mawakib in 1984, and Al-Mawqaf in 1993.

Early life 
Abu-Hanna was born in 1928 in Reineh, a town 3 km north of Nazareth. Because of his father's work, he moved between Jerusalem, Ramallah, Jaffa, Ashdod, Najd, Haifa, Nazareth, and then back to Reineh. He first attended school in Ashdod, after which he attended the Al Maaref School for Boys in Haifa. He then moved to Nazareth, where he participated in the 1936 Arab revolt. He later attended the Latin School in Reineh for a while, before completing secondary studies at the Ma'arif School in Nazareth. 

After high school, Abu-Hanna studied at the Arab College in Jerusalem, which enrolled outstanding students from Palestinian government schools. He was chosen to pursue studies in Britain. A government mission was assigned to him in 1947, but family circumstances and the Nakba eliminated this opportunity. He held a BA in English Literature from the University of Haifa.

Career 
After the Nakba, Abu-Hanna returned to Haifa in 1950, where he worked for the editorial board of the Al-Ittihad with Tawfik Toubi, Emile Habibi, Emile Touma, Saliba Khamis, Muhammad Khas, Ali Ashour, and Jabra Nicola. He helped to establish the Al-Ghad and Al-Jadeed magazines, which were issued in 1951 as a supplement to Al-Ittihad and then resumed publishing in 1953 after obtaining a license. Israeli authorities imprisoned him in Ramle Prison in 1958.

Personal life and death 
Abu-Hanna married Samia Farah, who was from Shefa-Amr. The couple had two daughters, Rabab Abu-Hanna and journalist Umayya Abu-Hanna, and a son, professor Amin Abu-Hanna. He died on 2 February 2022, at the age of 93.

Notable works

Poetry

 The Call of the Surgeon (Amman Library, 1969).
 Poems from the Garden of Patience (Akko, 1988).
 I swallowed your poison until reaching immunity (Haifa, 1990).

Hanna studies

 The World of the Short Story (Carmel Press, Haifa, 1979)
 My Soul on My Comfort: The Divan of Abd al-Rahim Mahmoud (Center for the Revival of Arab Heritage, Taybeh, 1985 AD)
 The Russian Teachers' House (in Nazareth, 1994)
 A journey in search of heritage (Haifa, 1994)
 Epic Literature
 Palestinian Poetry divan

References 

1928 births
2022 deaths
20th-century Palestinian poets
Palestinian poets
People from Reineh